Duke Jing may refer to these rulers from China's Eastern Zhou period:

Duke Jing of Jin (Ju) (died 581 BC)
Duke Jing of Jin (Jiao) (died 434 BC)
Duke Jing of Jin (Jujiu) ( 349 BC)
Duke Jing of Qin (died 537 BC)
Duke Jing of Qi (died 490 BC)

See also
King Jing (disambiguation)
Marquis Jing (disambiguation)